The 2009 Swedish Touring Car Championship season was the 14th Swedish Touring Car Championship (STCC) season. It was decided over nine race weekends (comprising eighteen races) at six different circuits.

Tommy Rustad won the drivers' championship for the second time. The ethanol powered Volvo C30 of Polestar Racing proved to be the fastest car over one lap, as evidenced by them setting all fastest qualifying times during the season (although grid penalties ruined the perfect score), but they were plagued by bad reliability. Instead, Thed Björk, driving for Flash Engineering, lead the championship most of the season, only to be overtaken in the last race.

The team championship also went down to the wire, with Polestar Racing besting WestCoast Racing by one point in the last race.

The entry of the Biogas.se team with their Volkswagen Scirocco meant the debut of a biogas powered car in STCC. Unfortunately, they had trouble matching the pace of the other factory teams and ended up last in the team championship.

Changes for 2009
There were several rule changes for the 2009 season.

Race format changes:
 Two races of approximately 20 minutes were held each race weekend.
 There were no mandatory pitstops in either race.
 The starting grid of the first race was determined by qualifying.
 The starting grid of the second race was determined by the results from the first race with the top eight positions reversed.
 The qualifying was divided into two sessions, where the eight fastest from the first (20 minutes) session moved on to the second (10 minutes) session.
 Both races used rolling starts.

Other changes:
 Yokohama replaced Michelin as tyre supplier.
 Each race weekend, the team that scored most points received a price sum of 100.000 SEK. For this purpose, some of the one-car teams combined two and two.
 The winner of the team championship was awarded an additional 100.000 SEK.
 The manufacturers' championship was dropped.

Drivers
These were the STCC entries for the 2009 season. Drivers with numbers 88 and higher also competed in Semcon Cup, open for privateers only. All teams were Swedish-registered.

* Mikko Tiainen, Petter Granlund and Joakim Ahlberg were on the official entry list, but failed to participate in any races during the season.

Race Calendar
The race calendar for this season was as follows:

Results and standings

The points system used for both the main championship and Semcon Cup was the standard FIA system of 10-8-6-5-4-3-2-1, awarded to the top eight finishers of each race. In case of ties in points, the championship positions were determined by the classification in the latest race.

Races

* Robert Dahlgren set the fastest qualifying time, but was moved down 10 places on the grid, due to engine changes.

♯ Robert Dahlgren set the fastest qualifying time, but was moved down 10 places on the grid, due to having received two yellow cards for unfair driving.

Drivers Championship

The drivers' championship was won by Tommy Rustad. In the end he scored the same number of points as Thed Björk, but won thanks to finishing higher in the last race.

* Tommy Rustad was given a 30 seconds time penalty for an incident in the start, dropping him from 7th to 14th place.

♯ Robert Dahlgren was docked 10 points in the drivers' championship, due to being deemed responsible for a crash with Thed Björk. Note that this penalty didn't affect the team score.

Team Championship

The team championship was won by Polestar Racing, a single point ahead of West Coast Racing.

Semcon Cup

The results in the 2009 Semcon Cup were as follows:

References

External links
STCC Official Website (Swedish)
TouringCarTimes – STCC news in English

Swedish Touring Car Championship seasons
Swedish Touring Car Championship
Swedish Touring Car Championship season